Saint-Marcel is a commune in the Indre department in central France.

Geography
The commune is traversed by the river Bouzanne.

Population

See also
Communes of the Indre department

References

Communes of Indre
Bituriges Cubi